The 1969–70 season was Manchester City's fourth consecutive season in the top tier of English football.

Kit
Manchester City overcame a slow start to sit fourth in the table with half of the season played, but a run of only three wins from 18 games saw City slump to finish in tenth place. City's form in the cup competitions were better by far: they defeated West Bromwich Albion 2–1 in the League Cup Final and Górnik Zabrze 2–1 in the European Cup Winners' Cup Final to become the first English team to win both a (UEFA-sponsored) European and a domestic cup in the same season.

Squad

Left club during season

Results

First Division

 Manchester City 2-1 West Bromwich Albion
 West Bromwich Albion 3-0 Manchester City

Results summary

Cup Winners' Cup
 Athletic Bilbao 3–3 Manchester City
 Manchester City 3–0 Athletic Bilbao
 Lierse S.K. 0–3 Manchester City
 Manchester City 5–0 Lierse S.K.
 Académica de Coimbra 0–0 Manchester City
 Manchester City 1–0 Académica de Coimbra
 Schalke 04 1–0 Manchester City
 Manchester City 5–1 Schalke 04
 Manchester City 2–1 Górnik Zabrze

References

Manchester City F.C. seasons
Manchester City
UEFA Cup Winners' Cup-winning seasons